"Good Riddance (Time of Your Life)" (or "Time of Your Life (Good Riddance)") is a song by American rock band Green Day, released in December 1997 as the second single from their fifth studio album, Nimrod (1997). Although different from the band's usual sound, it is one of their most popular songs. It has also become a staple of their concerts and is usually played as the final song.

"Good Riddance (Time of Your Life)" became a chart hit, peaking at number 11 on the US Billboard Radio Songs chart and reaching the top 20 in Australia, Canada, Iceland, and the United Kingdom. As of November 2022, the song had sold over 5 million copies, and is certified 5x platinum in the United States, platinum in the United Kingdom, and 2x Platinum in Australia, making it the band's most commercially successful single to date.

Background, composition, and musical style
Billie Joe Armstrong wrote "Good Riddance (Time of Your Life)" in 1993 about his girlfriend named Amanda who moved to Ecuador, with him naming the song "Good Riddance" to show his anger towards her. He did not show the song to his bandmates until the Dookie recording sessions later the same year. During the sessions, however, the song was determined to be too different from the rest of the songs on Dookie, and producer Rob Cavallo was unsure of how to structure the recording.

An early version of the song (in a different key, with a faster tempo and sparer arrangement) simply titled "Good Riddance" appeared as a B-side to the European single for "Brain Stew/Jaded".

When the time came to record Nimrod, Armstrong decided to record the song again, and Cavallo suggested they add strings to the track. He sent the band to play foosball in another room while he recorded the strings, which took "like fifteen, twenty minutes, maybe a half an hour at the most." Cavallo reflected on his decision to add the strings "I knew we had done the right thing. It was a hit the second I heard it."

In comparison to previous Green Day material, "Good Riddance (Time of Your Life)" features more mellow, contemplative lyrics with acoustic music. Band member Mike Dirnt said that the release of this song was probably the "most punk" thing they could have done.

The song has been labelled alternative rock, folk, folk punk, and acoustic rock.

Album version
The album version of the song begins with Armstrong messing up the opening chords twice, muttering "fuck" under his breath before starting over and getting it right, thus starting the song. Radio versions and the music video omitted the expletive.

Music video
The music video was directed by Mark Kohr in Los Angeles in November 1997, and is based on a concept by Armstrong. The video features Armstrong singing and playing an acoustic guitar in an apartment (filmed in LA's Ambassador Hotel), intercut with "pull-in" shots of various people involved in mundane activities. All of the subjects are shown seemingly staring into space absent-mindedly. Dirnt and Tré Cool make cameo appearances in the video as a person pumping gas (Dirnt), and an injured bike rider being attended by paramedics (Tré). When the video came out, the name of the song was inverted, hence the video's title is "Time of Your Life (Good Riddance)". This title was also used on the single cover.

In 1998, Green Day won their first MTV Video Music Award for Best Alternative Video for "Good Riddance (Time of Your Life)" and they were also nominated for Viewer's Choice.

The video can be found on their music video compilation DVD, International Supervideos!.

Legacy
To the band's surprise, the song became a hit at prom dances. Because of the song's lyrics, which many graduating seniors interpret as nostalgic and reflective of their time in high school, it has become a staple song at proms. Armstrong remarked that, in retrospect, the lyrics make sense when viewed that way. "The people that you grew up and braved the trials of high school with will always hold a special place. Through all the BS of high school you hope that your friends had the time of their life, and that's what the song is talking about".

The song is featured in the season nine episode of Seinfeld, entitled "The Chronicle" (also known as "The Clip Show"). The song plays in the closing minutes of the episode, which feature a series of bloopers, behind the scenes production, and a montage. It is the second-to-last episode of Seinfeld before the show's series finale in 1998.

On May 28, 2015, Rolling Stone named "Good Riddance (Time of Your Life)" as one of the 20 Best Graduation Songs of the Past 20 Years (1995–2015).

Credits and personnel
 Billie Joe Armstrong – acoustic guitar, vocals
 David Campbell – strings arrangement
 Conan McCallum – first violin

Additional credits
 Billie Joe Armstrong, Mike Dirnt, and Tré Cool – songwriting, production
 Rob Cavallo – production

Track listing

Charts and certifications

Weekly charts

Year-end charts

Decade-end charts

Certifications

Release history

References

1990s ballads
1997 songs
1997 singles
2008 singles
Folk ballads
Green Day songs
Glen Campbell songs
Songs written by Billie Joe Armstrong
Reprise Records singles
Song recordings produced by Rob Cavallo
Songs about parting
Graduation songs
Alternative rock ballads
Folk punk songs
American folk songs